Earthen plaster (adobe plaster, dagga) is a blend of clay, fine aggregate, and fiber.  Other common additives include pigments, lime, casein, prickly pear cactus juice (Opuntia), manure, and linseed oil.  Earthen plaster is usually applied to masonry, cob, or straw bale interiors or exteriors as a wall finish.  It provides protection to the structural and insulating building components as well as texture and color.

Physical composition
All plasters and stuccos have several common features:  they all contain a structural component, a binding element, and some form of fiber.  Usually the term plaster refers to a wall covering made from earth, lime or gypsum, while stucco uses a cement or synthetic binding element.

Clay: the binding agent
Clay is a soil component consisting of extremely fine particles.  Most clays consist of hydrous aluminum silicates, though there is a considerable amount of chemical variation among the clays.  Clay is cohesive and binds to the sand and the straw, holding the mixture together, as well as securing the mixture to the wall.  Clay is also plastic when wet, which makes the plaster mixture workable.

Sand: structural strength
Sand provides structure, strength, and bulk to earthen plasters.  Sand consists of tiny mineral granules of rock, its parent material.  Predominately composed of silicon dioxide (quartz), sand is a non-reactive substance.  Because sand occurs naturally in many subsoils, all of the sand necessary may be already found in the soil.

Fiber: tensile strength and reinforcement
Dry straw, hemp fiber, cattails, coconut fiber, and animal hair are all suitable fiber choices for earthen plasters.  Fiber forms a reinforcing meshwork in plasters, which helps to hold the plaster together.  Fiber also provides some flexibility to a dried plaster.  When clay dries it shrinks and tends to crack, but this cracking can be countered by the fiber.  The fiber used in plasters must be clean, dry, and mold-free.

Additives
Additives are usually blended with the clay, sand, and natural fiber to improve the workability and strength of a plaster.  Sometimes additives are added to the finish coat and other times additives may be added to all coats.  Some of the most common additives are wheat flour paste, manure, cactus juice, casein (milk protein) and various natural oils such as linseed oil.  Other additives include, salt, stearate, tallow, tannin, leaves and bark of certain trees, xanthan gum, alum, natural glues, gum arabic, kelp, lime, powdered milk, or the blood of livestock.

Flour paste
Cooked flour paste is a cheap natural glue that is easy to make from common ingredients.  The water and flour slurry is cooked until the gluten binds the elements of the mixture, creating a durable glue.  In plaster, the flour paste serves as a binding agent and a hardener.

Manure
Manure serves as a binding agent and gives plaster more body.  Manure also contains small natural fibers that provide additional tensile strength as well as reduce cracking and water erosion.  Different types of manure have different effects.  Horse manure has a high microfiber content, but cow manure has more hardening enzymes.  People have reported success with llama and alpaca  dung.  Manure should be fresh or fermented when mixed with plaster, as composted manure loses its enzymes and adhesive qualities.  Manure should be sifted before use.

Prickly pear cactus juice
The liquid from prickly pear cactus used to be one of the most common additives in the Americas.
 
The juice from the prickly pear cactus leaf pads will serve many functions.  According to some sources, it helps the plaster set and increases its stickiness or adhesion.  Cactus juice also serves as a stabilizer in that it helps make earthen plasters more water-resistant and more durable.  It also prevents dusting.
 
Cactus juice can increase plaster's workability and its ability to be formed into the desired shape.  Workability depends on the water content, the shape and size distribution of its aggregate (such as rock, sand, natural fiber, etc.), the age of the plaster, and the amount of other natural binder(s) (such as lime, wheatpaste, cactus juice, hardening vegetable oil, casein and other proteins, etc.)  Altering the water content, changing the aggregate mix, soaking the clay, or changing the binders will increase or decrease the plaster's workability. Excessive water will lead to increased bleeding (surface water) and/or segregation of aggregates (when the natural binder and aggregates start to separate), with the resulting plaster having reduced quality. The use of an aggregate with an undesirable gradation can result in a very harsh mix design with a very low workability, which cannot be readily made more workable by addition of reasonable amounts of water or binder.
 
Cactus juice works well because it contains pectin, a water-soluble long-chain carbohydrate that acts as the binding agent to increase the adhesion of an earthen plaster.  Pectin is also responsible for increasing the water resistance of an earthen plaster and has been used to augment lime plasters in both Mexico and the southwestern United States for hundreds of years.
 
Cactus juice is extracted by immersing cut leaves in water for as long as two weeks.

Effect on indoor climate
In principle, all wall coverings have an effect on the room climate: vapour permeable coatings designed to be capillary conductive, allow the wall layers behind them to absorb moisture and release it again. Due to the property of clay plasters to absorb a lot of moisture (up to nine times more than gypsum), a climatic buffer is created on the wall, which absorbs moisture and releases it again when the air humidity is low. These properties distinguish clay plasters from so-called "film-forming" surfaces, such as emulsion and latex paints, which have little or no permeability to moisture in the layers below.
The area of the plastered wall has the greatest influence on the ability of the clay plaster to act as a climatic buffer. The thickness of the clay layer is of secondary importance in indoor use, as more than 80% of the moisture is initially bound in the top two millimetres of the clay wall. Just 10 mm is important for the "climate buffer effect" in "normal living conditions" because thick plaster layers (> 20 mm) are too slow to react to the constantly changing room air humidity.
Clay stores heat (depending on the amount installed), and due to its high specific heat capacity, clay walls are able to compensate for temperature fluctuations. Thermal conductivity 0.47...0.93 W/(m-K).

Interior earthen plaster
Pure earthen plaster (plaster without lime, cement, or emulsified asphalt) is applied to interior surfaces more frequently than exteriors.  Before the plaster can be applied, it must have a surface to bind to.  Many types of wire mesh may be used, such as expanded-metal lath, woven wire lath, or welded wire lath.  Reed mats are another option.  If the plaster is being applied to a smooth surface such as drywall or plywood, a mixture of sand and wheat paste may be painted on to the surface to create the texture needed for plaster to bond.
 
The plaster is usually applied in three coats. The first layer of plaster is called a "scratch coat". A "comb" is used to scratch the surface horizontally or in a crisscross pattern to provide a key for the second layer. In the United States, the "comb" is commonly referred to as the "scratcher". The next layer is called the "brown coat" or leveling coat. It is leveled with tools called "Darbys" and "Rods", scraped smooth, and floated to provide a nice even surface onto which to apply the color coat. It is then allowed to dry (cure) for 7–10 days minimum to allow "checking" (shrinkage) to take place. The final layer is referred to as the "color coat" or "finishing coat", and is typically 3 mm (1/8") thick.  It usually consists of clay with no fiber and sand added.  The color coat material was found in certain areas, red, green, white with mica and other colors, the material was gathered, made into a uniform consistency,  water added, applied to the walls in multi layers until the desired surface was acceptable.  The process in Spanish was known as, 'alisando'.

Advantages and disadvantages of earthen plaster
Earthen plasters are less toxic and energy intensive than many other wall coverings, which makes them appealing to the environmentally conscious.  Earthen plasters are also easily repaired and inexpensive. They resist water penetration but are permeable to water vapor.  However, earthen plasters are often more labor-intensive than other forms of wall covering. If the mix does not have the correct component proportions, then many other problems may occur, such as dusting and cracking.  Earthen plasters are not approved by all local building codes, and some require the use of cement stabilizers or asphalt emulsion. Earthen plaster is a rare wall covering in the developed world and there is a dearth of local experts for construction and repair.

See also
 Building construction
 Exterior Insulation Finishing System
 Green building
 Natural building
 Plasterwork
 Tadelakt
 Wattle and daub
 Zellige

Notes

Sources
McHenry, Paul Graham Jr.  Adobe:  Build it Yourself.  The University of Arizona Press:  Tucson.  1974.
Norton, John.  Building with Earth: A Handbook.  Intermediate Technology Publications 	Limited:  London 1997.
 

Soil-based building materials
Plastering